Dorzano is a comune (municipality) in the Province of Biella in the Italian region Piedmont, located about  northeast of Turin and about  south of Biella.

References

Cities and towns in Piedmont